Babrantium or Babrantion was a town of ancient Greece on the island of Chios.

Its site is located near modern Daskalopetra.

References

Populated places in the ancient Aegean islands
Former populated places in Greece
Ancient Chios